Cliff R. Stroud (7 November 1920 – 23 April 2015) was an English international lawn and indoor bowler.

Bowls career
Stroud started bowling in 1954 for the Trowbridge Westbourne club in Wiltshire (outdoors) and the Christie Miller club (indoors).

He was an England international from 1967 to 1972 and won the gold medal in the fours at the 1972 World Outdoor Bowls Championship with Peter Line, Ted Hayward and Norman King. 

He also represented England at the 1970 British Commonwealth Games in the fours event.

Personal life
He took up bowls aged 12 for the Tottenham Somerford BC. Stroud was a company director and general manager by trade and in 2015. 

Stroud died in April 2015 at the age of 94.

References

1920 births
2015 deaths
English male bowls players
Bowls World Champions
Bowls players at the 1970 British Commonwealth Games
Commonwealth Games competitors for England